Foster is a small lunar impact crater that lies to the southeast of the larger crater Joule, on the far side of the Moon. The rim of Foster is slightly eroded, and the narrow inner walls slope directly down to the relatively dark interior floor. The rim has a small outward bulge along the southwest side. There is a small craterlet on the floor next to the northern rim. A tiny impact in the southeast part of the crater interior is surrounded by a small skirt of high albedo material, producing a bright patch.

Satellite craters
By convention these features are identified on lunar maps by placing the letter on the side of the crater midpoint that is closest to Foster.

References

 
 
 
 
 
 
 
 
 
 
 
 

Impact craters on the Moon